St. Fintan's is a settlement in Newfoundland and Labrador. American restaurateur, author, game show host, and television personality Guy Fieri visited the settlement in 2016.

Populated places in Newfoundland and Labrador